Sympathetic Magic is the fifth studio album by American indie rock band Typhoon. Recorded in 2020 during the COVID-19 pandemic, it was released without any prior announcements on January 22, 2021. This was the third studio album released under the Roll Call Records label.

Background 
On October 29, 2020, six days before the 2020 United States presidential election Typhoon released the single "Welcome To The Endgame" with a corresponding music video directed by Danielle Sullivan.

The album was released without any prior announcements or marketing on all streaming platforms on January 22, 2021, with physical copy pre-orders being available on Bandcamp. In the album announcement, Kyle Morton describes the album as:

Critical reception 
The album was well regarded by NPR Music, The Current, and Paste magazine, with the latter saying "Sympathetic Magic appeals to both our desire for heartwarming, acutely detailed scenes and the untangling of complex emotions that can nag at a person" and NPR's Robin Hilton saying "…it’d be easy for music as conceptual as this, and as driven by big ideas as this music is, to take itself [too] seriously, and it never does. It’s always just pitch perfect”. Atwood Magazine praised the album for its production, arrangement, and memorability.

Track listing

Personnel

Musicians 

 Kyle Morton – vocals, guitar
Shannon Steele – violin, vocals
Alex Fitch – drums, percussion
Devin Gallagher – kalimba, ukelele, glockenspiel, percussion
 Toby Tanabe – bass
Dave Hall – guitar
 Eric Stipe – trumpet, vocals
Pieter Hilton – drums, percussion, vocals
Ben Morton – guitar
Tyler Ferrin

Technical 

 Produced by Kyle Morton
 Mastering by Adam Gonsalves
 Mixed by Jeff Stuart Saltzman

References

External links 

 Official website

2021 albums
Typhoon (American band) albums